Michael B. Scanlon  (November 1843 – January 18, 1929) was an Irish-American professional baseball manager.

Scanlon served as manager for two major league teams; the 1884 Washington Nationals of the Union Association and the 1886 Washington Nationals of the National League. In 196 games as a manager, he won 60 games and lost 132 games for a .313 winning percentage. Born in Cork, Ireland, Scanlon died in 1929 in Washington, D.C.

Notes

References

External links
 Managerial statistics at Baseball-Reference.com, or Retrosheet

Major League Baseball managers
1843 births
1929 deaths
Minor league baseball managers
Irish emigrants to the United States (before 1923)